Elmer Ephraim Ellsworth (April 11, 1837 – May 24, 1861) was a United States Army officer and law clerk who was the first conspicuous casualty and the first Union officer to die in the American Civil War. He was killed while removing a Confederate flag from the roof of the Marshall House inn in Alexandria, Virginia.

Before the war, Ellsworth led a touring military drill team, the "Zouave Cadets of Chicago". He was a close personal friend of Abraham Lincoln, who as President later eulogized him as "the greatest little man I ever met". After his death, Ellsworth's body lay in state at the White House. The phrase "Remember Ellsworth" became a rallying cry and call to arms for the Union Army.

Early life
Born as Ephraim Elmer Ellsworth in Malta, New York, Ellsworth grew up in Mechanicville, New York, and later moved to New York City. In 1854, he moved to Rockford, Illinois, where he worked for a patent agency. In 1859, he became engaged to Carrie Spafford, the daughter of a local industrialist and city leader. When Carrie's father demanded that he find more suitable employment, he moved to Chicago to study law and work as a law clerk.

In 1860, Ellsworth moved to Springfield, Illinois, to work with Abraham Lincoln. Studying law under Lincoln, he also helped with Lincoln's 1860 campaign for president, and accompanied the new elected president to Washington, D.C. Ellsworth stood 5 ft 6 in (168 cm) tall; the six-foot-four Lincoln called him "the greatest little man I ever met".

Military career
In 1857, Ellsworth became drillmaster of the "Rockford Greys", the local militia company. He studied military science in his spare time. After some success with the Greys, he helped train militia units in Milwaukee and Madison. When he moved to Chicago, he became Colonel of Chicago's National Guard Cadets.

Ellsworth had studied the Zouave soldiers, French colonial troops in Algeria, and was impressed by their reported fighting quality. He outfitted his men in Zouave-style uniforms, and modeled their drill and training on the Zouaves. Ellsworth's unit became a nationally famous drill team.

Following the fall of Fort Sumter to Confederate Army troops in mid-April 1861, and Lincoln's subsequent call for 75,000 volunteers to defend the nation's capital, Ellsworth raised the 11th New York Volunteer Infantry Regiment (the "Fire Zouaves") from New York City's volunteer firefighting companies, and was then commissioned as the regiment's commanding officer.

Death
Ellsworth was killed at the Marshall House on May 24, 1861 (the day after Virginia's secession was ratified by referendum) during the Union Army's take-over of Alexandria. During the month before the event, the inn's proprietor, James W. Jackson, had raised from the inn's roof a large Confederate flag that President Lincoln and his Cabinet had reportedly observed through field glasses from an elevated spot in Washington. Jackson had reportedly stated that the flag would only be taken down "over his dead body".

Before crossing the Potomac River to take Alexandria, soldiers serving under Ellsworth's command observed the flag from their camp through field glasses and volunteered to remove it. Having seen the flag after landing in Alexandria, Ellsworth and seven other soldiers entered the inn through an open door. Once inside, they encountered a man dressed in a shirt and trousers, of whom Ellsworth demanded what sort of a flag it was that hung upon the roof.

The man, who seemed greatly alarmed, declared he knew nothing of it, and that he was only a boarder there. Without questioning him further, Ellsworth sprang up the stairs followed by his soldiers, climbed to the roof on a ladder and cut down the flag with a soldier's knife. The soldiers turned to descend, with Private Francis E. Brownell leading the way and Ellsworth following with the flag.

As Brownell reached the first landing place, Jackson jumped from a dark passage, leveled a double-barreled shotgun at Ellsworth's chest and discharged one barrel directly into Ellsworth's chest, killing him instantly. Jackson then discharged the other barrel at Brownell, but missed his target. Brownell's gun simultaneously shot, hitting Jackson in the middle of his face. Before Jackson dropped, Brownell repeatedly thrust his bayonet through Jackson's body, sending Jackson's corpse down the stairs.

Ellsworth became the first Union officer to die in the Civil War. Brownell, who retained a piece of the flag, was later awarded a Medal of Honor for his actions.

Lincoln was deeply saddened by his friend's death and ordered an honor guard to bring his friend's body to the White House, where he lay in state in the East Room.  Ellsworth's body was then taken to the City Hall in New York City, where thousands of Union supporters came to see the first man to fall for the Union cause. Ellsworth was then buried in his hometown of Mechanicville, in the Hudson View Cemetery (see: Col. Elmer E. Ellsworth Monument and Grave).

Thousands of Union supporters rallied around Ellsworth's cause and enlisted. "Remember Ellsworth" became a patriotic slogan. The 44th New York Volunteer Infantry Regiment called itself the "Ellsworth Avengers" as well as "The People's Ellsworth Regiment".

Simultaneously, Jackson became a celebrated martyr for the Confederate cause. A plaque that the Sons of Confederate Veterans placed within a blind arch near a corner of a prominent hotel that stood on the former site of the Marshall House commemorated Jackson's role in the affair for many years. However, Marriott International removed the plaque in 2017 shortly after it purchased the hotel (see: Marshall House historical marker).

Legacy
After the Marshall House incident, soldiers and souvenir hunters carried away pieces of the flag and inn as mementos, especially portions of the inn's stairway, balustrades, and oilcloth floor covering. Relics associated with Ellsworth's death became prized souvenirs.

President Lincoln kept the captured Marshall House flag, with which his son Tad often played and waved. The flag apparently passed to Brownell, and upon his death in 1894, his widow offered to sell small pieces of the flag for $10 and $15 each. She presented one fragment to "an early mentor" of her husband's; his descendants apparently sold it more than a century later.

Today, most of the flag is held by the New York State Military Museum and Veterans Research Center in Saratoga Springs, which also has Ellsworth's uniform with an apparent bullet hole. Another fragment is held by the Smithsonian Institution's National Museum of American History, along with a blood-stained piece of oilcloth and a scrap of red bunting from the Marshall House. Yet another fragment is held by Bates College's Special Collections Library. A fragment bearing most of a star is on display at the Fort Ward Museum and Historic site in Alexandria, along with the kepi that Ellsworth wore when he was killed, patriotic envelopes bearing his image, and the "O" from the Marshall House sign that a soldier had taken as a souvenir.

Artifacts collected during the construction of the Hotel Monaco were preserved by local archeologists. They may be seen in the Torpedo Factory Art Center's third floor exhibit (the Alexandria Archaeology Museum), three blocks away on King Street.

The new county seat of Pierce County, Wisconsin, located in the undeveloped center of the county to settle the controversy between two established cities, was named Ellsworth, Wisconsin, in his honor. He is also the namesake of Ellsworth, Michigan; DC's Fort Ellsworth, and possibly Ellsworth, Iowa; Ellsworth, Kansas; and Mount Ellsworth near Green River, Utah.

Song: "Brave Men, Behold Your Fallen Chief" on IMSLP by Joseph Philbrick Webster

He is a character in the 2012 film Saving Lincoln, in which his death is portrayed.

Ellsworth only recently (2021) became the topic of a full-length book by Meg Groeling entitled First Fallen: The Life of Colonel Elmer Ellsworth, the North’s First Civil War Hero (Savas Beatie, 2021).

See also

List of Medal of Honor recipients
Theodore Winthrop

Notes

References

Further reading
 Biography of Ellsworth
 
 Davis, William C., and the Editors of Time-Life Books. First Blood: Fort Sumter to Bull Run. Alexandria, Virginia: Time-Life Books, 1983. .

External links
 Ellsworth's hometown and place of burial, Mechanicville, NY
  150th Commemoration of the Civil War: The Death of Ellsworth exhibit, National Portrait Gallery, April 29, 2011 - March 18, 2012 
 Smithsonian collection - shotgun used to kill Ellsworth (picture)
 Elmer Ellsworth, Citizen Soldier
 11th Infantry Regiment: New York: Civil War Newspaper Clippings: New York State Military Museum and Veterans Research Center
 Envelope Cachet - Our Cause is Just. Fight on Remember Ellsworth.

1837 births
1861 deaths
Union Army officers
People of Illinois in the American Civil War
People of New York (state) in the American Civil War
People from Springfield, Illinois
People from Chicago
People from Malta, New York
Union military personnel killed in the American Civil War
Burials in Saratoga County, New York
Illinois Republicans
Deaths by firearm in Virginia